Eugene Clayton Reusser (February 14, 1922 – August 2, 2010)  was an American football coach.  He was the head football coach at Bethel College in North Newton, Kansas, serving for two seasons, from 1965 to 1966, and compiling a record of 0–18.

Head coaching record

Football

References

External links
 

1922 births
2010 deaths
Bethel Threshers football coaches
People from La Junta, Colorado